The 2011 Turkish GP2 Round was the first round of the 2011 GP2 Series season. It was held on May 6–8, 2011 at Istanbul Speed Park, Istanbul, Turkey, supporting the 2011 Turkish Grand Prix.

This race was the first in the series for the new Dallara GP2/11 chassis and Pirelli as the sole tyre supplier for GP2. The GP2/11 was introduced as a replacement for the Dallara GP2/08 chassis, which was used between 2008 and 2010.

Classification

Qualifying

Notes
 – Davide Valsecchi was handed a ten place grid penalty for driving in the opposite direction during the qualifying session.
 – Mikhail Aleshin did not contest the remainder of the weekend, having fractured a metacarpal in his left hand during an accident in qualifying.

Feature Race

Sprint Race

Standings after the round

Drivers' Championship standings

Teams' Championship standings

 Note: Only the top five positions are included for both sets of standings.

See also 
 2011 Turkish Grand Prix
 2011 Istanbul Park GP3 Series round

References

External links
 GP2 Series official web site: Results

Istanbul Park
Istanbul Park GP2 Series round
Auto races in Turkey
Sport in Istanbul
International sports competitions hosted by Turkey
May 2011 sports events in Turkey